Jos Murer (August or September 1530 – 14 October 1580) was a Zürich poet, topographer, stained glass maker, and mathematician. Several of his stained glass works are in the Swiss National Museum.

In 1576, he printed a map of Zurich, known as the Mureplan.

References

External links

1530 births
1580 deaths
Artists from Zürich
Stained glass artists and manufacturers
Topographers